Table tennis was contested at the 2011 Parapan American Games from November 13 to 18 at the CODE II Gymnasium in Guadalajara, Mexico.

Medal summary

Medal table

Medal events

External links
2011 Parapan American Games – Table Tennis

Events at the 2011 Parapan American Games
2011 in table tennis
2011 Parapan American Games